Microangiopathy (also known as microvascular disease, small vessel disease (SVD) or microvascular dysfunction) is a disease of the microvessels, small blood vessels in the microcirculation. It can be contrasted to coronary heart disease, an angiopathy that affects the larger vessels.

Type
Cerebral small vessel disease refers to a group of diseases that affect the small arteries, arterioles, venules, and capillaries of the brain. Age-related and hypertension-related small vessel diseases and cerebral amyloid angiopathy are the most common forms.

Coronary small vessel disease is a type of coronary heart disease that affects the arterioles and capillaries of the heart. Coronary small vessel disease is also known as microvascular angina, microvascular dysfunction, non-obstructive coronary disease, or previously cardiac syndrome X.

Pathophysiology
One cause of microangiopathy is long-term diabetes mellitus. In this case, high blood glucose levels cause the endothelial cells lining the blood vessels to take in more glucose than normal (these cells do not depend on insulin). They then form more glycoproteins on their surface than normal, and also cause the basement membrane in the vessel wall to grow abnormally thicker and weaker. Therefore, they bleed, leak protein, and slow the flow of blood through the body. As a result, some organs and tissues do not get enough blood (carrying oxygen and nutrients) and are damaged, for example, the retina (diabetic retinopathy) or kidney (diabetic nephropathy). Nerves and neurons, if not sufficiently supplied with blood, are also damaged, which leads to loss of function (diabetic neuropathy, especially peripheral neuropathy).

Massive microangiopathy may cause microangiopathic hemolytic anemia (MAHA).

Diagnosis

Treatment 
See therapy of arteriosclerosis.

Laser therapy of diabetic retinopathy.

A number of medicines, such as calcium dobesilate, are being marketed for the specific treatment of microangiopathy. The efficacy of calcium dobesilate has been described e.g. in patients with diabetic retinopathy or diabetic nephropathy.

References

External links 

Histopathology